Trichofrondosa is a genus of mites in the family Trematuridae.

Species
 Trichofrondosa amazonasae (Hirschmann, 1986)     
 Trichofrondosa frondosa (Hirschmann, 1972)     
 Trichofrondosa guayaramerinensis (Hirschmann, 1986)

References

Mesostigmata